Carlos Obregón Borrero (February 21, 1929 – January 1, 1963) was a Colombian poet from Bogota. He is usually affiliated with the Mito movement. His work begun to be critically acclaimed by critics posthumously for his expressive intensity, exquisite form and metaphysical and spiritual nature that characterize it. His work is currently considered among the most significant in Colombia, despite the lack of interest generated within his own lifetime. Borrero committed suicide in Madrid, Spain, on January 1, 1963.

Works 
  (Madrid, 1957)
  (Palma de Mallorca, 1961)
  (Procultura, Bogotá, 1985)
  (Bogotá, 2004)

References 
 OBREGÓN, Carlos. Estuario. National University of Colombia, Colección de poesía (Libro recobrado), 147 páginas. Bogotá, 2004.

External links 

People from Bogotá
20th-century Colombian poets
1963 suicides
1929 births
Colombian male poets
Suicides in Spain
1963 deaths